Joel Waweru Mwangi has been the Anglican bishop of  Bishop of Nairobi in the Province of Kenya since 2010:

Mwangi was born on 4 October 1959 at Gakira. He was educated at the high school  in Kangema and the University of Nairobi. He joined the Church Army, rising to be Assistant General Secretary, Africa. He was ordained in 1994 and has served the church in Minnesota, Sheffield and Buruburu before his appointment as bishop.

References

1959 births
People from Central Province (Kenya)
21st-century Anglican bishops of the Anglican Church of Kenya
Anglican bishops of Nairobi
Living people
University of Nairobi alumni